Die Geisterinsel is a singspiel in 3 acts by Johann Friedrich Reichardt to a libretto by Friedrich Wilhelm Gotter based on  The Tempest by William Shakespeare. 

The libretto by Gotter, after an earlier version by his friend Friedrich von Einsiedel, had already been hailed as a masterpiece by Goethe and first set by Fleischmann in 1796. Goethe also promoted Fleischmann's setting but the opera was not a success. The years 1798-1799 saw six more operas based on The Tempest, of which Reichardt's, commissioned by August Wilhelm Iffland for the Nationaltheater, Berlin, was both the most successful and the most successful of Reichardt's operas as a whole. It was premiered 6 July 1798.

References

1796 operas
Operas
German-language operas
Operas based on The Tempest